Kik or KIK may refer to:

Organisations
 KiK, a textile discounter based in Bönen, Germany
 KIK FM, a dance music station located in Darwin, Australia
 Klub Inteligencji Katolickiej, a Polish organization grouping Catholic intellectuals

Other uses
 County Kilkenny, Ireland, Chapman code KIK
 Kik, Croatia, a village near Lovinac
 Kik Messenger, instant messenger application for smartphones
 The Kik, a Dutch music group
 Kik Pierie, Dutch football player
 Kill It Kid, an English band

See also
 Kick (disambiguation)